Kimberly W. Benston (born January 18, 1953) is an American literary historian and academic administrator.

Benston earned his bachelor's, master's, and doctoral degree from Yale University. He taught at his alma mater and Princeton University before joining the Haverford College faculty in 1984. Benston was appointed Francis B. Gummere Professor of English in 2002  and served as provost between 2012 and 2015. He was named president of Haverford College later that year and took office on July 1, 2015. Benston stepped down from the presidency and returned to teaching in 2019.

References

1953 births
Living people
Yale University alumni
Yale University faculty
Princeton University faculty
American literary historians
21st-century American historians
20th-century American historians
20th-century American male writers
21st-century American male writers
Haverford College faculty
Presidents of Haverford College